Love Call may refer to:

 "Love Call" (Rythem song), 2008
 "Love Calls" (song), a 2002 song by Kem
 Love Call (album), a 1968 album by Ornette Coleman, or the title track
 Love Calls, a 1968 album by Eddie "Lockjaw" Davis with Paul Gonsalves